The Building at 1406 Romero in Las Vegas, New Mexico was listed on the National Register of Historic Places in 1985.

It has stuccoed adobe walls built upon a stuccoed foundation, and an L-shaped plan.  It has a food drying attic above what may be an original flat earthen roof.

It was deemed significant as an "unaltered, classic example of the New Mexico Vernacular type of about 1895.

References

New Mexico vernacular architecture
National Register of Historic Places in San Miguel County, New Mexico
Buildings and structures completed in 1895